is a street in Kyoto, Japan. En route, it is blocked by Higashi Hongan-ji Temple and Kyoto Station.

The Ashikaga (Muromachi) shogunate prospered until the Ōnin War (1467–1477), during which Kyoto disintegrated into the two areas Kamigyō and Shimogyō. After the war, Muromachi Street was the only road between them.

During the Edo period, Muromachi Street saw the growth of kimono wholesalers, some of which survive today. Each July, districts centered on the intersection between Muromachi Street and Shijō Street in Shimogyō build floats to parade during the Gion Matsuri festival.

Establishments

See also 
 :ja:京都市内の通り

Notes 

Streets in Kyoto